Raghubir Yadav  is an Indian actor, music composer, singer and set designer who works in Hindi films. He made his film debut with Massey Sahib (1985), in which he played the title role. He has won two International Awards as Best Actor for Massey Sahib, FIPRESCI Critic's Award, Venice Film Festival, 1986 and the IFFI Best Actor Award (Male): Silver Peacock Award at the 11th International Film Festival of India, 1987. The film also featured writer and social activist in National School of Drama, New Delhi until 1977.

Career

Theatre
Yadav has performed as an actor and singer in over 70 plays and about 2500 shows, travelling in caravans, living in tents and performing on makeshift stages in villages, towns and cities of India with the Parsi Theatre Company (1967–1973). He was with the Rangoli Puppet Theatre, Lucknow (1973–1974), performing with glove puppets. At the National School of Drama Repertory (1977–1986), he acted in about 40 plays in over 2000 shows. He has also contributed to music, sets, costumes and masks.

Film
He was seen in many milestone films in the following decades. Three films that he has acted in have received Academy Award nominations for Best Foreign Language Film (Salaam Bombay! ,Water and Lagaan).  Raghubir Yadav is one of the few Indian actor to have received the Silver Peacock Best Actor Award, at the International Film Festival of India. His most acclaimed role was as the drug addicted "Chillum" in Salaam Bombay! (1988). He has acted in Firaaq. In 2011, he played the lead role in the film Dear Friend Hitler, which takes its name from two letters Mahatma Gandhi wrote Adolf Hitler, in 1939 immediately before World War II and Christmas Eve 1940 after the war had started, to prevent and to stop the war.

Television
Yadav started his television career with the television program Mungerilal Ke Haseen Sapne (1988), playing the lead character "Mungerilal". Amaravathi ki Kathayein (1994-'95).

Later he played the roles of Haji Nasruddin in the television program Mullah Nasruddin (also spelled as Mulla Nasiruddin) and the lead in Chacha Chaudhary. He also played the lead role for BI T.V. in Arjun Pandit.

Music
 He composed and sang in films that include Maya Memsaab, Massey Sahib, Rudaali, Aasmaan Se Gira, O Darling Yeh Hai India, Samar, Sunday, Darna Mana hai, Ramaji London Waale, Billu  and Dilli 6. He sang the title song of Chacha Chaudhary. He sang a song in Amir Khan's Peepli Live called "Mehngai Dayain" with bhadwai village mandli in which he was later praised by many of Indian film fraternity and public at large.
 He provided singing and voice for ads: Pepsi, Parle, Vim, Kotak Mahindra, Icy Cool Mint, Coke, Midday, Bagh Bakari Chai, Crack cream, Maggie Mania, Britannia etc.
 He also sang and composed the famous MP tourism ad -'MP ajab hai, sabse gajab hai'
 He composed the music for Ghasiram Kotwal, Chotte Sayeed Bade Sayeed, Chaupra Kamaal Naukar Jamal and Chacha Chaudhary, ballet for song and drama division. Composed and sang "Maggie Mania", conceived, written and composed by Ramlila for Dilli 6.
 He recently collaborated with Hitesh Sonik to sing 'Lamh Tera' in the second episode of Coke Studio @ MTV, Season 2. The show was aired on MTV India on 14 July and this song was the fifth and last to be shown on the show. The song is a folk song from Madhya Pradesh. In ancient times, the journey from one place to another would take days. People while travelling would then usually sing to ensure everyone is safe. This style of singing was called 'lum tera'. A member/group at the front of the caravan would sing loudly (lambi ter) and the members/groups at the end would sing back as a response, thereby ensuring connectivity.
 He has sung a song, "Bhagan ke Rekhan ki bahangiya" in the movie Issaq. Raghubir has shown his talent again.

Awards
 Silver Peacock for the Best Actor Award (Male): Massey Sahib at the 11th International Film Festival of India (1987).
 FIPRESCI Critic's Award, Venice for Best Actor: Massey Sahib (1986).
 Best Supporting Actor (Male) (Comedy Series) at 2020 Filmfare OTT Awards for Panchayat.

Filmography

Web series

References

External links
 
 Raghubir Yadhav on Bollywood Hungama
 During the depression, music was my sole respite: Raghubir Yadav

Yadav Raghuvir
National School of Drama alumni
IFFI Best Actor (Male) winners
People from Jabalpur
Yadav Raghuvir
Yadav Raghuvir
Yadav Raghuvir
Male actors from Madhya Pradesh
Living people
1957 births
20th-century Indian male actors
21st-century Indian male actors